Denis Dmitrievich Nevedrov (born 6 April 1994, Yugorsk, Khanty-Mansi Autonomous Okrug), is a Russian futsal player who plays for Tyumen-2. In 2014-2015 played for Russia U-21

Biography 
Denis Nevedrov started playing futsal since 7 years in Yugorsk old and in 16 years he moved in futsal club «Tyumen». In 2012–2013 with second team Ishim-Tyumen-2 he won 1st Division Russian Championships and with senior team got a bronze medal Superleague. After season 2017-2018 he played 17 games for BLIK (Nefteyugansk) in Superleague 2018/2019. Denis Nevedrov was in squad for «Tyumen», but now he plays in Tyumen-2

Honours 
In MFK Tyumen:
  Bronze Superleague 2012/2013
In Ishim-Tyumen-2:
 Winner 1st Division Russian Championships 2012/2013
In BLIK (Nefteyugansk):
 Silver International tournament of Tyumen region 2018

External links
 Profile in amfr.ru

References

Living people
1994 births
Russian men's futsal players
Sportspeople from Khanty-Mansi Autonomous Okrug